Judge Steve Harvey is an American arbitration-based reality court comedy show hosted by Steve Harvey. The series premiered on ABC on January 4, 2022. Unlike most courtroom programming which airs in the daytime television bracket, Judge Steve Harvey airs in prime time. Also in contrast to most courtroom programming, which typically airs a new episode for each weekday, Judge Steve Harvey takes the approach of a sitcom television schedule, airing one new episode per week. 

Casting for Judge Steve Harvey was conducted in September 2021 and filming for the series ran from October to November 2021. The show is produced by Den of Thieves in association with Disney Branded Television.

In April 2022, the series was renewed for a second season.

On-air feel and format

Episode openings
The courtroom set takes on a ritzy, majestic display, Harvey's bench extending vastly from one side to the other, taking up most of the courtroom. In similar vein, the courtroom is filled with flashy spotlights with Harvey wielding a gold-colored gavel, and the program's opening theme decorated with extravagant pomp and circumstance. As part of the title sequence, Harvey introduces himself show-offishly while talking the talk: he declares his judicial handling is without the need of legal degrees or law backgrounds, just his unique brand of commonsense. Harvey adds to that how he has transcended the wearing of a judge's robe, instead, donning a swanky all-black suit. A grand entrance into the courtroom follows the title sequence in which the walls of the courtroom separate for Harvey to enter through, smoke filling the scene around him. Rubin Ervin hypes up the crowd and introduces Harvey with emphatic expression as raucous music sounds.

Case proceedings
Proceedings begin with Harvey instructing litigants that they have thirty seconds to summarize their case for the viewing audience before he moves deeper into interrogating the parties. Before and during the proceedings, the audience is heard freely hooting, hollering, standing, cheering, whooping, and booing at the proceedings. This is all prompted by Harvey's satire, derision, and ridicule at the parties before him. Harvey spends most of the cases engaged in his antics and mischievous behaviors, such as writing out signs and raising them up in the air, in one case, raising up a "WTF" sign at a misbehaved litigant repeatedly speaking out of turn. Harvey's mischievous approach, teasing, and satire typically expose the follies and foolishness of the guests in regards to their testimonies.

Demanding acknowledgment for the parody nature of the program, Harvey openly jeers at guests who take the proceedings too seriously by acting as though they are in a real court of law, Harvey going so far as scolding the parties to stop pretending that they are in a real court and to remember and recognize they are in a TV studio. Establishing some early catchphrases, Harvey follows each verdict with the remark, “And that’s the way I see it!” Harvey routinely acknowledges with pride that his verdicts are from his gut feelings, based on his own internal logic as opposed to any particular code of law.

Judge Steve Harvey

Judicial handling approach
Unlike most other television court show arbitrators, such as Judy Sheindlin (Judge Judy and Judy Justice), Greg Mathis (Judge Mathis), Marilyn Milian (The People's Court), etc., Harvey has never held any judgeship or legal licenses and has no jurisprudence background, which is typically mandated by television court show programming. To compensate for this, however, the miniseries has billed itself as "Harvey playing by his own rules, basing his courtroom on his own life experiences and some good old common sense".

Judge Steve Harvey has been advertised as, "Harvey taking on a variety of conflicts and characters in his courtroom, from small claims to big disputes and everything in between". Deviating from the standard as far as judicial wear as well, Harvey is seen donning a black dress shirt, suit jacket, tie and dress pants while presiding.

In contrast to most programming in the arbitration-based reality show genre which takes to a more serious, businesslike format, Harvey seeks to exude comedy in his Judge Steve Harvey series. Another court show popular for its amusement, Judge Mathis, has balanced humor with a businesslike approach to justice, contrary to Harvey's comedic and informal approach, filling airtime with his mischievousness and antics and his live audience contributing to that. This all takes the same approach Harvey has used to skyrocket the game show Family Feud to top-rated daytime ratings success. Harvey drew considerable attention to the series for his relentless derision and scoffing humor, double takes and slow-burn reactions, such that the game show began competing in Nielsen ratings for top spot against Judge Judy (a typical daytime ratings leader for many years of its original run) over the 2020–21 television year. Following the release of a trailer for the series on December 1, Harvey's arbitration handling approach was likened to his game show hosting approach in media reports. Characterizing his judicial approach, Harvey stated:

Production

Filming location
Judge Steve Harvey is filmed at the Trilith Studios in Fayetteville, Georgia. Located at 461 Sandy Creek Road, the Trillith Studios have been characterized as "sprawling and high-tech". The studios are currently owned by River’s Rock LLC, an Atlanta-based investment service company that develops and funds studio facilities for the production of film, television, music, and video games. Fayetteville lies 22 miles south of Atlanta, which is considered an important hub for television and film production.

Inside details and systems
Despite the comedic nature of the program and Harvey's playful sternness and metafiction-style reprimands of his guests not to take the proceedings seriously as a court of law, the series is unscripted with individuals who have filed legal grievances in actual courts. Those individuals were later invited to the program by producers to have their disputes heard by Steve Harvey.

As is the case among the rest of arbitration court shows in which litigants cannot pursue a claim once ruled on by the presiding arbiter, rulings on Judge Steve Harvey are said to likely take the same legally binding format. That said, there is no official confirmation of this. Whether Harvey rules in favor of the plaintiff or defendant, the outcomes are considered a "win-win for everyone involved" because none of the litigants are responsible for paying the judgments. According to the show's official website, "all awards/judgments are paid by production".

Cast

Main 
 Steve Harvey as himself (Judge)

The bailiff on the series is former Douglas County, Georgia bailiff Nancy Price. The audience warm-up, Rubin Ervin, appears at the start of each episode and also instructs the audience to rise when Harvey makes his entrance.

Guest stars 
 Scott Steiner as himself
 Sunkee Angel as herself
 Colbert Minga as Derek Porter
 J. J. Dillon as himself
 Kevin E Tribble as Ok Mr Hightower
 Ronnie Gossett as himself
 Tyrone Evans Clark as himself
 Sham “Lady Sham” Ibrahim as herself
 Kevin Sullivan as himself
 Tiffani Brooks as herself
 Daphne Spring as herself

Episodes

Reception

Ratings

Media reviews and ABC's scrutiny of Harvey's judicial behavior
News publication The Decider posted an article arguing that the "ludicrous idea" that Steve Harvey is presiding over small claims court is forgiven once viewing the program and realizing it's less of a court show and more of a comedy. The Decider went on to state that ABC is able to capitalize on the Family Feud host’s penchant for his playfully appalled behavior of speechless stares, incredulous reactions, and exasperated one-liners, a Steve Harvey formula that has led to audience amusement and high ratings in the game show genre and other hosting gigs.

With that frame of mind, it was speculated that the court show has the potential to be "an entertaining diversion, but not one that you’d care to see more than once or twice". The program's cases were characterized as goofy and self-explanatory for someone to resolve. Adding to that point, however, the article stated that the elements of these types of cases play well into what Harvey does best–reading situations and reacting.

The article made a point of praising Harvey for being, thus far, able to ridicule without being disrespectful of his guests, stating, "So far, Harvey has managed to make fun of the cases without belittling the people arguing them. That’s definitely going to be a fine line to toe, but Harvey has been around for a long time and should be able to manage that balance with ease".

However, in an appearance on Jimmy Kimmel Live!, Harvey himself revealed that he was formally chastised by ABC executives for referring to a litigant of the program as "stupid", that the network preferred he'd take a friendlier approach. During the case in question, Harvey proceeded from the bench over to the litigant to have a picture taken together, Harvey citing that he needed a photograph with the stupidest person alive. In sharing the matter with Jimmy Kimmel, Harvey objected to perceived cancel culture and political correctness, stating that celebrities can't get away with saying anything any longer and that it's having a negative impact on comedians.

See also
The court show genre has consisted of other comedies:

Eye for an Eye
Gary Busey: Pet Judge

Notes

References

External links
 
 

2022 American television series debuts
American Broadcasting Company original programming
English-language television shows
2020s American comedy television series
2020s American legal television series
2020s American reality television series
Arbitration courts and tribunals
Court shows
Television series by Disney–ABC Domestic Television
Television shows filmed at Trilith Studios